Denzel Bentley Ntim-Mensah (born 29 January 1995), is an English professional boxer who held the British middleweight title from 2020 to 2021.

Professional career
Bentley made his professional debut on 14 October 2017, scoring a first-round knockout (KO) victory against Casey Blair at the York Hall in London.

After compiling a record of 13–0 (11 KOs) he faced Mark Heffron in an eliminator for the British middleweight title on 12 September 2020 at the York Hall. Bentley scored a knockdown in the second round en route to a unanimous draw, with all three judges scoring the bout 95–95.

The pair fought in a rematch two months later on 13 November at the BT Sport Studio in London, with the vacant British middleweight title on the line. Bentley landed a right hand in the second round, causing damage to Heffron's left eye. Bentley began to target Heffron's damaged eye over the next two rounds. At the end of the fourth, Heffron's eye was swollen shut, forcing his trainer to pull Heffron out of the fight, handing Bentley a fourth-round stoppage victory via corner retirement (RTD) to capture the British title.

His first loss occurred on 24 April 2021 against the Commonwealth middleweight champion Felix Cash.

He is currently set to contest the WBO middleweight title against the current world champion Janibek Alimkhanuly.

Professional boxing record

References

External links

Living people
1995 births
British male boxers
Boxers from Greater London
English sportspeople of Ghanaian descent
Middleweight boxers
British Boxing Board of Control champions